Mančić is a Serbian surname. Notable people with the surname include:

Anita Mančić (born 1968), Serbian actress
Marko Mančić (born 1983), Serbian footballer
Suzana Mančić (born 1956), Serbian actress

Serbian surnames